Qualification for the 2013 Canadian Direct Insurance BC Men's Curling Championship consisted of both direct and indirect qualification. The defending champion and the highest-ranked team on the Canadian Team Ranking System qualified directly. Fourteen more teams qualified through playdown events and qualification events.

Summary

Qualification events

Kootenay Inter-regional qualifier
The Kootenay Inter-regional qualifier was held from December 7 to 9, 2012 at the Trail Curling Club in Trail.

Teams
The teams are listed as follows:

Results

A Event

B Event

C Event

Playoffs

Thompson/Okanagan Inter-regional qualifier
The Thompson/Okanagan Inter-regional qualifier was held from December 7 to 9, 2012 at the Kelowna Curling Club in Kelowna.

Teams
The teams are listed as follows:

Results

A Event

B Event

C Event

Playoffs

Island Playdown qualifier
The Island Playdown qualifier was held from December 7 to 9, 2012 at the Alberni Valley Curling Club in Port Alberni.

Teams
The teams are listed as follows:

Results

A Event

B Event

C Event

Playoffs

Lower Mainland Playdown qualifier
The Lower Mainland Playdown qualifier was held from December 14 to 16, 2012 at the Chilliwack Curling Club in Chilliwack.

Teams
The teams are listed as follows:

Results

A Event

B Event

C Event

Open Qualification Round
The Open Qualification Round was held from January 4 to 6 at the Golden Ears Winter Club in Maple Ridge.

Teams
The teams are listed as follows:

Results

A Event

B Event

C Event

References

Canadian Direct Insurance BC Men's Curling Championship - Qualification